Pingyao Catholic Church is a Roman Catholic church located in Pingyao County, Shanxi, China.

History 
Christianity spread into the country as early as 1886 by an Italian missionary. The church traces its origins to the former Wudao Temple, founded in 1910. It was severely damaged by the Red Guards during the ten-year Cultural Revolution. The current version was completed in 1984. In November 2011, it was inscribed as a municipal cultural relic preservation organ by the Pingyao government.

Gallery

References

Further reading 
 
 

Churches in Shanxi
1910 establishments in China
Churches completed in 1910
Romanesque Revival church buildings in China
Tourist attractions in Pingyao County